Orion, officially the Municipality of Orion (formerly Udyong),, is a 2nd class municipality in the province of Bataan, Philippines. According to the 2020 census, it has a population of 60,771 people.

History

2019 Orion fire
On January 29, 2019, a massive fire burned down over 900 houses in Sitio Depensa, Barangay Kapunitan, killing 1 person, injuring 50 persons, and affecting 1,018 families, or 6,131 individuals. The blaze was attributed to children who carelessly played with matches and afterwards mistakenly tried to douse the flames with gasoline. The fire was able to spread quickly since the sitio consisted mostly of bamboo houses, most of which stored gasoline for fishing boats. The town was then placed under state of calamity.

Geography
Orion is a city located in the southern part of Bataan Peninsula directly south-southwest of San Fernando, Pampanga (the regional city center) and south of Balanga (the province capital), accessible via the Roman Superhighway.

According to the Philippine Statistics Authority, the municipality has a land area of  constituting  of the  total area of Bataan.

Climate

Barangays
Orion is politically subdivided into 23 barangays.

Demographics

In the 2020 census, Orion had a population of 60,771.

Economy

Notable personalities

 Cayetano Arellano — was the first Chief Justice of the Supreme Court of the Philippines under the American Civil Government. He was Chief Justice from 1901 until his retirement on April 12, 1920, making him the longest-serving Chief Justice.
 Francisco Baltazar — known much more widely through his nom-de-plume and birth name Francisco Balagtas, was a prominent Filipino poet. The famous epic, Florante at Laura, is regarded as his defining work.
 Kerby Raymundo — is a retired Filipino professional basketball player who last played for Meralco Bolts in the Philippine Basketball Association. Known as "The Kid", he was a former star player with the Letran Knights during his NCAA years.
 Eric Rodriguez — PBA player, played for the teams Burger King Titans, Air21, Meralco and Ginebra. Tough defense and role player and lead the team Letran Knights under coach Louie Alas at the NCAA 2002–2005.
 Janine Tugonon — is a Filipina beauty titleholder who placed first runner-up in the Miss Universe 2012 pageant. She placed first runner up in the Binibining Pilipinas 2011, but won in Binibining Pilipinas 2012, and became the representative of the Philippines in Miss Universe 2012 and placed first runner-up behind Miss USA, Olivia Culpo.
 Raymond Almazan — is a Filipino professional basketball player who currently plays for Meralco Bolts in the Philippine Basketball Association. He is given a moniker "The Rock 'N` Roll" by sportscaster Mico Halili because of his resemblance to Pinoy rock legend Joey "Pepe" Smith.
Emilio Angeles Gancayco ( Orion, August 20, 1921 - Manila, July 28, 2009 ) was a Filipino judge. Gancayco was judge of the Philippine Supreme Court from 1987 to 1991.

Gallery

References

External links

[ Philippine Standard Geographic Code]

Municipalities of Bataan
Populated places on Manila Bay